Salmoni (before 1915: Κούκουρα - Koukoura) is a village and a community in the municipality of Pyrgos, Elis, Greece. According to the 2011 census, the village had 612 inhabitants and the community, including the village Alfeios, 643. It is situated in low hills on the right bank of the river Alfeios, at 70 m elevation. It is 2 km southwest of Strefi, 3 km southeast of Varvasaina and 8 km east of Pyrgos. The Greek National Road 74 (Tripoli - Olympia - Pyrgos) passes north of the village. A previously independent community, Salmoni is part of Pyrgos since 1997. The current Greek Orthodox metropolitan of Thessaloniki, Anthimos, was born in Salmoni in 1934. The village Alfeios, 3 km west of Salmoni, has two churches, Metamorfoseos tou Sotiros and Saint Raphael.

Population

See also

List of settlements in Elis

References

Pyrgos, Elis
Populated places in Elis